Henry Danby Seymour (1 July 1820 – 4 August 1877) was a British gentleman and Liberal Party politician.

Life
Seymour was the eldest son of Henry Seymour and wife Jane Hopkinson. Alfred Seymour was his brother. He matriculated at Christ Church, Oxford in 1838, graduating B.A. in 1842. In 1862 he was called to the bar at Lincoln's Inn.

A member of the Liberal Party, Seymour sat as Member of Parliament (MP) for Poole from 1850 to 1868 and served as Joint Secretary to the Board of Control, the body which oversaw the activities of the East India Company, from 1855 until the Company's abolition in 1858. In November 1876 he was elected to the London School Board.

Works
Seymour climbed Mount Ararat in 1846, and wrote two topographical works, Russia on the Black Sea and Sea of Azof and Caravan Journeys and Wanderings in Persia, Afghanistan, Turkistan, and Beloochistan.

In 1856 Seymour donated fragments of the Tomb of Sobekhotep, Thebes, to the British Museum. He translated as A History of Egypt Under the Pharaohs a work in two volumes by Heinrich Karl Brugsch, with Philip Smith: this was published in 1879, after his death.

Collector
Seymour gathered a large collection of Old Masters, among other things Albrecht Dürer's Portrait of a Peasant Woman (now in the British Museum), and the triptych attributed to Goswin van der Weyden entitled St Catherine and the Philosophers (now in the National Gallery, London).
He also owned a cabinet embellished with Japanese lacquer panels and ormolu mounts attributed to Adam Weisweiller which was delivered to Louis XVI at Versailles in 1784.  Seymour loaned the cabinet to the Victoria and Albert Museum one year prior to his death in 1877.

References

External links
 

1820 births
1877 deaths
Henry Danby Seymour, of Trent
Liberal Party (UK) MPs for English constituencies
UK MPs 1847–1852
UK MPs 1852–1857
UK MPs 1857–1859
UK MPs 1859–1865
UK MPs 1865–1868
Members of the London School Board
Mount Ararat